Sterphus aurifrons is a species of Hoverfly in the family Syrphidae.

Distribution
Juan Fernández Islands.

References

Eristalinae
Insects described in 1926
Diptera of South America
Taxa named by Raymond Corbett Shannon
Endemic fauna of the Juan Fernández Islands